The National Federation of Republican Women (NFRW) is the women's wing of the Republican Party in the United States.

Overview
Founded in 1938 by Joyce Porter Arneill and Marion Martin, it is a grassroots political organization with more than 1,600 local clubs in the 50 states and in the U.S. territories. Members at the local, state and national levels work to recruit and elect Republican candidates, advocate the party's philosophy and initiatives, and advance women in the political process. The NFRW's national headquarters are located in Alexandria, Virginia.

National membership is open to every Republican woman by way of her local club or through a national associate membership. Members of a local club are also granted membership in their state Federation.

Mission
Once an auxiliary of the Republican National Committee (RNC), the NFRW is financially and organizationally independent today. The goals of the organization are to:
Promote an informed public through political education and activity
Increase the effectiveness of women in the cause of good government
Facilitate cooperation among the national and state Federations of Republican Women's clubs
Foster loyalty to the Republican Party and promote its principles and candidates in all elections, including non-partisan elections
Support Republican objectives and policies and work for the election of Republican nominees

The NFRW hosts a biennial convention in odd-numbered years to conduct organizational business, including the election of national officers, and to provide educational, leadership and networking opportunities for members.

History
Beginning in the late 1930s, Marion Martin, the assistant chairman of the Republican National Committee and National Committeewoman for Maine, saw a need for uniformity amongst the numerous Republican women's clubs across the country. These clubs lacked a standard set of by-laws and were too detached from the Republican party, so Martin worked to present the goals of the women's clubs as relevant to the male leadership within the party. After a national committee vote in December 1937, the National Federation of Women's Republican Clubs was formed. The original 11 statewide Federations that organized as charter members were California, Colorado, Connecticut, the District of Columbia, Indiana, Maryland, Michigan, Missouri, Montana, New Jersey and Pennsylvania. The first meeting was held in September 1938 at the Palmer House in Chicago, representing 85 clubs and 95,000 women. Acting as an auxiliary to the Republican National Committee, the NFRW was designed primarily to educate members of party politics, to promote loyalty to the Republican Party, and to emphasize the potential roles of women within the party leadership. Pamphlets and study programs were disseminated to the clubs in order to ensure a standardized educational platform. Martin pushed for a more partisan outlook towards politics, hoping to spread Republican philosophy while still avoiding supporting controversial issues. When the United States entered into World War II, the NFRW decreased its efforts to build their unified partisan organization. Twenty-five percent of American women worked for the wartime effort, moving away from Republican club meetings, and towards a more wide-ranging patriotic effort. The Federation avoided taking a stance on isolationism, pledging to continue an objective educational program. While criticized, the Federation believed this non-position to be the best way to support the Republican party and to support women becoming more involved in politics by developing their own informed opinions.

In 1948, Elizabeth Farrington became president of the NFRW. Rather than continuing with Martin's administration of the Federation, Farrington expanded the organization by appealing to new constituencies, like women in the south and African American women. Unlike Martin, who believed that women's issues were not separate from men's issues, Farrington emphasized separate and unique female issues, relevant to all women, and in doing so, she united the women's movement within the Republican party. Under Farrington's leadership, the NFRW became the National Federation of Republican Women in January of 1953, and moved out from under the financial umbrella of the RNC. This allowed for leadership of the NFRW to be selected from within the organization, rather than appointed by the RNC, as it had been in the past. Farrington also integrated religious symbolism and practices into the Federation, as well as a strong anti-communist belief, which attracted a flood of new members. Under Farrington's leadership, the Federation's membership rose to half a million women.

During the Eisenhower administration, the use of television took politics out of just the public sphere and placed it within the private sphere of the home as well. The Federation took advantage of this exposure by holding political events with candidates and prominent Republican figures in their homes and neighborhoods, thus leading to a stronger grassroots movement at the local level. By the 1950’s, the NFRW was recognized as a successful organization by the Republican party, and it was praised for its altruistic motivations to educate the public of Republican ideals. As unpaid volunteers, members of the NFRW were seen as doing work for the good of the public and for the good of their own families, not for their own personal gain, leading to a stronger foundation of American values and morals within their communities. This ultimately aided in the formation of a value-based identity for the Republican platform for decades to come.

Symbols
The seal of the National Federation of Republican Women is a registered trademark. It features the Golden American Eagle holding a quill pen and standing guard over a ballot box. Adopted in 1944, it portrays the Federation's interest in the protection and integrity of the electoral process. The American Eagle is adopted from the great seal of the United States. The quill is symbolic of the power of words, especially as contained in the Declaration of Independence and the United States Constitution.

Past NFRW presidents
 Joyce Porter Arneill of Colorado, 1938–41 
 Jessica M. Weis of New York, 1941–42
 Mary Elizabeth Pruett Farrington of Hawaii, 1949–52
 Dorothy Andrews Elston of Delaware, 1963–68
 Gladys O'Donnell of California, 1968–71
 Betty Heitman of Louisiana, 1978–80
 Marilyn Thayer of Louisiana, 1996–97

See also
Women in the United States Senate

References

External links 
 Official website
 Records of the National Federation of Republican Women 1938–1960, Dwight D. Eisenhower Presidential Library

Republican Party (United States) organizations
Women's wings of political parties
Women's organizations based in the United States